Sainte-Anne is a small village on the Indian ocean island of Réunion. It is located on the east coast between the towns of Sainte-Rose and Saint-Benoît.

Populated places in Réunion